Frome is a small village centered on the sugar mill of the eponymous estate in Westmoreland, Jamaica.

See also
List of cities and towns in Jamaica

References

Populated places in Westmoreland Parish

Notable Person: Tenaj Josey